The golden-fronted whitestart (Myioborus ornatus) or the golden-fronted redstart, is a species of bird in the family Parulidae. It is found in forest, woodland and scrub in the Andes of Colombia and far western Venezuela.

References

golden-fronted whitestart
Birds of the Colombian Andes
golden-fronted whitestart
Taxonomy articles created by Polbot